Archibald "Arch" Boyd (4 July 1872 – 1905 or 1902) was a rugby union player who represented Australia.

Boyd, a scrum-half, was born in Sydney and claimed 1 international rugby cap for Australia. His debut game was against Great Britain, at Sydney, on 5 August 1899.

References

Australian rugby union players
Australia international rugby union players
1872 births
Year of death missing
Rugby union scrum-halves
Rugby union players from Sydney